Faire hurler les murs is a Canadian short documentary film, directed by Jean Saulnier and released in 1972. The film is a portrait of artist Jordi Bonet, as he works on the mural at the Grand Théâtre de Québec.

The film was co-winner, with Roger Blais's Grierson, of the Canadian Film Award for Best Documentary at the 25th Canadian Film Awards in 1973. The film also won the awards for Best Editing in a Non-Feature (Claude Lavoie), Best Cinematography in a Non-Feature (Paul Vézina, Yves Maltais) and Best Musical Score in a Non-Feature (Les Stein).

References 

1972 films
1972 documentary films
1972 short films
Canadian short documentary films
French-language Canadian films
1970s Canadian films
Films shot in Montreal
Best Short Documentary Film Genie and Canadian Screen Award winners